The Pan America is a motorcycle announced by Harley-Davidson in 2018 for the 2020 model year, alongside the streetfighter-styled Bronx. It will be powered by the all-new liquid-cooled 1,250 cc 60 degree Revolution Max V-twin engine and feature adventure motorcycle styling. Industry analysts said it was most likely to compete with street-oriented adventure tourers like the BMW R1250GS.

An earlier offroad-capable model was the Buell Motorcycle Company Ulysses XB12X, made from 2005 when Buell was owned by Harley-Davidson.

References

Pan America
Motorcycles introduced in 2018